Sarangadhara (Telugu: సారంగధర, lit. beautiful-body-carrier) is a 1937 Telugu-language film directed by P. Pullayya under Star Combines. Banda Kanakalingeswara Rao and Santha Kumari donned the lead roles supported by Addanki Srirama Murthy as Rajaraja Narendra. It is based on the epic of the same name by Gurajada Apparao. The movie was a runaway hit, and in the aftermath of its success Pullayya married Santha Kumari.

Cast
Banda Kanakalingeswara Rao as Sarangadhara
Santha Kumari as Chitrangi
Sriranjani as Kanakangi
Addanki Srirama Murthy as King Narendra
Kannamba as Queen Ratnangi
Pulipati Venkateswarlu

References

External links
 

1937 films
1930s Telugu-language films
Films directed by P. Pullayya
Indian black-and-white films
Indian musical drama films
1930s musical drama films
1937 drama films